Kernaalanjärvi is a medium-sized lake in Finland. It is situated in the municipality of Janakkala in the Tavastia Proper region. The lake is part of Kokemäenjoki basin and it drains into Lake Vanajavesi through Hiidenjoki River.

See also
List of lakes in Finland

References

Kokemäenjoki basin
Landforms of Kanta-Häme
Lakes of Janakkala